2020 QG, also known by its internal designation ZTF0DxQ, is an Earth-crossing asteroid, a few meters in diameter. It was first imaged by the Zwicky Transient Facility (ZTF) at the Palomar Observatory about 6 hours after this closest approach, and was later identified by Kunal Deshmukh, a student at the Indian Institute of Technology Bombay, along with colleagues Kritti Sharma, Chen-Yen Hsu and Bryce T. Bolin analyzing images from the ZTF.

At the time, 2020 QG passed closer to Earth than any known asteroid, except for those that became meteors.

Orbit and classification 
2020 QG orbits the Sun at approximately 1.0–2.9 AU every 964.2 days (2.64 years) after its 2020 orbital perturbation by its close approach with Earth. Before perturbation, it orbited every 990.5 days (with a semi-major axis of 1.9 AU).

Before its perturbation, flying by Earth, the asteroid's orbit had an eccentricity of 0.49 and an inclination of 5.5° (with respect to the ecliptic). The asteroid came to perihelion (closest approach to the Sun) on 1 August, and then on 16 August 2020 the close approach to Earth reduced its orbital period. From the encounter with the larger gravity field, the orbital eccentricity became 0.48 and the inclination stands at 4.7°.

Detectability 
Asteroids that are similar in size to 2020 QG are difficult to detect because they are small and therefore dim. Between 2010–2020, the asteroid was never brighter than about apparent magnitude 31 making it about 10 thousand times fainter than a typical discovery magnitude of 21. The Hubble Space Telescope needs 3 weeks of exposure time to image magnitude 31 objects and has an extremely small field of view, making serendipitous discoveries essentially impossible at those magnitudes. During the 2020 approach, the asteroid appeared dimmer than magnitude 24 until it had a solar elongation of only 60 degrees. The asteroid was imaged when it had a solar elongation of 125 degrees and was around magnitude 19.

Future approaches 
2020 QG will make several close approaches with Earth in the future, albeit at larger distances compared to the August 2020 encounter.

See also 

 List of asteroid close approaches to Earth in 2020
 Asteroid impact prediction

Notes

References

External links 
 
 
 ZTF Finds Closest Known Asteroid to Fly By Earth, Whitney Clavin, Caltech, 18 August 2020

Minor planet object articles (unnumbered)
Discoveries by the Zwicky Transient Facility
20200816
20200816